Solvan "Slick" Naim is an Algerian-American rapper, writer, actor, and director. He is known for creating, writing, and starring in the Netflix comedy series It's Bruno!, which debuted in 2019. As a filmmaker, Naim has also directed the film Full Circle, and episodes of The Blacklist, Power, and Snowfall. Also in 2019, Netflix announced it was developing a "hip-hop movie musical" adaptation of Romeo and Juliet.

As a rapper, Naim released his album Proof of Concept on May 17, 2019.

References

External links 
 

American television writers
American people of Algerian descent
American television directors
Rappers from Brooklyn
American male rappers
21st-century American rappers
Year of birth missing (living people)
Living people
21st-century American male musicians